Atse Buurman (born 21 March 1982) is a Dutch One Day International cricketer. He is a wicketkeeper-batsman but when he made his debut for the Netherlands in 2007 it was as a specialist batsman. But after the retirement of Jeroen Smits has concentrated on keeping. Buurman once made 53 against India A. He plays club cricket for VOC Rotterdam.

External links

1982 births
Living people
Dutch cricketers
Netherlands One Day International cricketers
Netherlands Twenty20 International cricketers
Cricketers at the 2011 Cricket World Cup
Sportspeople from Dordrecht
Wicket-keepers